Saajan Chale Sasural is a 1996 Indian Hindi-language romantic comedy film starring Govinda, Tabu, Karisma Kapoor, Kader Khan, and Satish Kaushik. It was directed by David Dhawan. It is a remake of the Telugu film Allari Mogudu (1992). Saajan Chale Sasural was a commercial success and was listed second among the top five "super-hits" of 1996 by the ''Indian Express.

Plot
Shyamsunder (Govinda) is a naive villager who has a great interest in music.  He travels to the city, making friends with Muthuswami (Satish Kaushik), a South Indian tabla player.  The president of the TIPS cassette company, Khurana (Kader Khan), is impressed with his musical abilities and promotes him to a high position.  As he goes back to repay his debts in the village, he receives tragic news of the death of his wife Pooja (Karisma Kapoor), who has died in a flood. He then marries Khurana's daughter Divya (Tabu). When Khurana has a heart attack, Shyamsunder finds his "presumed dead" wife Pooja in the hospital. He then has to fool his two wives, even if it includes leading a double life to make sure Pooja and Divya don't discover he has married both of them.

Cast
 Govinda as Shyamsundar Gupta
 Tabu as Divya Khurana
 Karishma Kapoor as Pooja Daschandani
 Kader Khan as Dhirendra Khurana
 Shakti Kapoor as Singer / Musician
 Satish Kaushik as Muranchand "Mutthu" Swami
 Satish Shah as Rampyare Rastogi / Company manager
 Mukesh Rishi as Nana
 Anjana Mumtaz as Hemalata Gupta
 Himani Shivpuri as Fake Hemalata Gupta
 Arun Bakshi as Madhav
 Arjun as Thakur's son
 Dinesh Hingoo as Travel Agent
 Rakesh Bedi as Hotel servant
 Bharat Kapoor as Thakur
 Raju Shrestha as Shyamsunder's friend

Soundtrack
The music for this movie was composed by Nadeem-Shravan. The song "Tum To Dhokebaj Ho" & "Dil Jaan Jigar Tujh Pe Nisaar" became popular. Singers Kumar Sanu, Alka Yagnik, Udit Narayan, Poornima, Vinod Rathod, Kunal Ganjawala & Satyanarayan Mishra lent their voice for the album.

References

External links
 

1990s Hindi-language films
1996 films
Films scored by Nadeem–Shravan
Films directed by David Dhawan
Hindi remakes of Telugu films
Polygamy in fiction
Indian romantic comedy films
1996 romantic comedy films